Events in the year 2021 in Dominica.

Incumbents
 President: Charles Savarin
 Prime Minister: Roosevelt Skerrit

Events
Ongoing — COVID-19 pandemic in Dominica

Sports
23 July to 8 August – Dominica at the 2020 Summer Olympics.

Deaths
6 July – Patrick John, politician, prime minister, premier (born 1938).

References

 
2020s in Dominica
Years of the 21st century in Dominica
Dominica
Dominica